Asak may refer to:

Iran
Asak may refer to one of several places:
 Asak, Gilan
 Asak, Hirmand, Sistan and Baluchestan Province
 Asak, Qorqori, Hirmand County, Sistan and Baluchestan Province

North Africa
Asak (Tuareg), traditional songs of the Tuareg people

Norway
Asak (Norway), a village in Østfold